John Michael Friedman (September 24, 1975 – September 9, 2017) was an American composer and lyricist. He was a Founding Associate Artist of theater company The Civilians.

His musical Bloody Bloody Andrew Jackson opened on Broadway in October 2010.

Friedman won a 2007 Obie Award for sustained excellence. Additionally, he received a MacDowell Fellowship, a Princeton Hodder Fellowship, a Meet The Composer Fellowship, and was a Barron Visiting Professor at The Princeton Environmental Institute in 2009. At the time of his death, he was the Artist in Residence and Director of the Public Forum at the Public Theater and was also the Artistic Director of City Center Encores! Off-Center.

Friedman died on September 9, 2017, aged 41, from complications related to HIV/AIDS. In 2018, he received a star on the Playwrights’ Sidewalk at the Lucille Lortel Theater.

Background
Born in Boston, Friedman grew up in Philadelphia. He attended Germantown Friends School, after which he studied history and literature at Harvard College. While at Harvard, he studied under Bernard Rands, Mario Davidovsky, and Elizabeth Swados.

Career
Friedman was most well known as the co-creator of the critically acclaimed musical Bloody Bloody Andrew Jackson which premiered in New York at the Public Theater and subsequently transferred to Broadway. Other credits include the musical “Unknown Soldier,” which premiered at the Williamstown Theatre Festival and had a critically acclaimed run at Playwright Horizons, “Love’s Labour’s Lost,” which premiered at the Delacorte Theater in Central Park and was nominated for a Drama Desk Award for Best Musical, Saved, In the Bubble, The Brand New Kid, God's Ear, The Blue Demon and This Beautiful City.

He worked with Itamar Moses on The Fortress of Solitude, an adaption based on the Jonathan Lethem book of the same name. It opened September 30, 2014 at The Public Theater.

In the months leading up to the 2016 U.S. Presidential Election, Michael traveled the country creating a series of songs based on interviews he conducted. Those songs became his “State of the Union Songbook,” which was presented by The New Yorker Radio Hour.

Michael was a founding Associate Artist of The Civilians, the acclaimed investigative theater company. His work with The Civilians included “Gone Missing,” “In the Footprint,” “The Great Immensity,” “Paris Commune,” (co-written with Steve Cosson) “(I Am) Nobody’s Lunch,” and “This Beautiful City” as well as the score for Anne Washburn’s critically acclaimed “Mr. Burns, a Post-Electric Play.” His last collaboration with Civilians’ Artistic Director Cosson, “The Abominables,” opened at Children’s Theater Company in Minneapolis in September 2017.

His music has also been heard at the New York Shakespeare Festival, New York Theatre Workshop, Roundabout Theatre Company, Second Stage, Soho Repertory Theater, Signature Theatre, Theater for a New Audience, and The Acting Company. He wrote the music for Anne Washburn's Mr. Burns, a Post-Electric Play.

Regionally, his work has been featured at Hartford Stage, The Humana Festival of New American Plays, ART, Berkeley Rep, Dallas Theatre Center, Williamstown Theatre Festival, Portland Center Stage, and internationally at London's Soho and Gate Theatres and the Edinburgh Festival.

He was the dramaturg for the 2004 Broadway revival of A Raisin in the Sun, directed by Kenny Leon.

At the time of his passing, he was writing a commissioned work on American history for the Oregon Shakespeare Festival and a musical about the adult film industry with Bess Wohl and The Civilians titled Pretty Filthy.

The Civilians
With The Civilians, Friedman was the composer and lyricist for Canard, Canard, Goose?, Gone Missing, [I Am] Nobody's Lunch, This Beautiful City, The Great Immensity, and In the Footprint, and co-author of Paris Commune. His work on Pretty Filthy can be seen in the theater company's premiere production of the new musical.

In partnership with Ghostlight Records, the Civilians will be releasing cast recordings of nine shows that Friedman wrote or co-wrote. The first three, The Great Immensity, This Beautiful City, and The Abominables were released on October 18, 2019. Recordings of Paris Commune and (I Am) Nobody's Lunch were released on August 14, 2020.

Notable works
 Canard, Canard, Goose? (2002)
 Paris Commune (2004)
 (I Am) Nobody's Lunch (2006)
 Gone Missing (2007)
 This Beautiful City (2008)
 Saved (2008)
 Bloody Bloody Andrew Jackson (2008)
 In the Footprint (2010)
 Mr. Burns, a Post-Electric Play (2012) (Incidental music)
 The Fortress of Solitude (2012)
 Love’s Labour’s Lost (2013)
 Pretty Filthy (2015)
 Rimbauld in New York (2016) (with many others)
 The Abominables (2017)

Awards and nominations

References

External links

 "A Composer Finds Ideas All Over" by Stephen Holden, The New York Times January 31, 2010
 TimeOut
Michael Friedman papers, 1980–2018 Billy Rose Theatre Division, New York Public Library for the Performing Arts

1975 births
2017 deaths
American musical theatre composers
American musical theatre lyricists
American LGBT musicians
Musicians from Philadelphia
Songwriters from Pennsylvania
Harvard College alumni
AIDS-related deaths in New York (state)
Germantown Friends School alumni
21st-century American composers